Admiral Sir Henry Ducie Chads,  (24 February 1788 – 7 April 1868) was an officer in the Royal Navy who saw action from the Napoleonic Wars to the Crimean War.

Family background 
Chads was born in Marylebone, London, the eldest son of Captain Henry Chads, R.N. (died on 20 October 1799) and his wife, Susannah. He was baptised at three weeks old at St Marylebone Parish Church. He was the brother of Lieutenant-colonel John Cowell Chads, who died, President of the British Virgin Islands at Tortola on 28 February 1854, aged 60.

Career 

Chads entered the Royal Naval Academy in Portsmouth as a 12-year-old on 25 October 1800, and in 1803 embarked aboard the 74-gun ship of the line HMS Excellent, sharing in the defence of Gaeta and the capture of Capri. In July 1808, he joined the 36-gun frigate  and during the Mauritius campaign distinguished himself at the occupation of the Île de la Passe, gateway to the Isle de France (now Mauritius).  On the defeat of the British squadron by the French, he was made prisoner, but was rescued from captivity when the British captured Mauritius, and re-appointed first lieutenant of Iphigenia.

In December 1812, as senior Lieutenant of the frigate HMS Java, he distinguished himself in the battle between that ship and the American frigate Constitution. Captain Lambert having been mortally wounded, Chads (himself severely wounded) continued the struggle, until compelled to surrender after nearly four hours' fighting.  This action secured promotion and the command of the sloop Columbia. Chads afterwards served at Guadeloupe in 1815.
In 1823, he was prominent in the expedition against Rangoon, as a result of which he was made post-captain on 25 July 1825, created a Companion of the Bath, and received the thanks of the Government of India, and praise in the British House of Commons. He was next engaged in forcing the passage of the Bocca Tigris prior to the First Opium War in September 1834, aboard , which he commanded from 1834 to 1837.

Chads reformed the whole system of naval gunnery, both as regards weight of metal and rapidity of fire. He was promoted to rear-admiral on 12 January 1854 and, flying his flag in HMS Edinburgh, was third in command of the fleet sent to the Baltic under Sir Charles Napier, who claimed that Chads 'knew more about gunnery than any man in the service'. He was one of the leaders in the bombardment and capture of the fortress of Bomarsund. He struck his flag in 1855, and as a reward for his services was created a Knight Commander of the Bath. From 1856 to the end of 1858, he was Commander-in-Chief, Queenstown, being promoted to vice-admiral on 24 November 1858, and then to full admiral on 3 December 1863. In 1865 was created Knight Grand Cross of the Bath.

In literature
Chads makes a brief appearance, in his heroic role as First Lieutenant of the Java, in the novel The Fortune of War by Patrick O'Brian.

References

Further reading
 

1788 births
1868 deaths
Royal Navy admirals
Royal Navy personnel of the Napoleonic Wars
Royal Navy personnel of the War of 1812
British military personnel of the First Anglo-Burmese War
Royal Navy personnel of the Crimean War
Knights Grand Cross of the Order of the Bath
War of 1812 prisoners of war held by the United States